South Carolina Highway 187 (SC 187) is a  state highway in the U.S. state of South Carolina. The highway travels through mostly rural areas of Anderson County.

Route description
SC 187 begins at an intersection with SC 184 (Elberton Highway) southwest of Iva, within Anderson County. It travels in a fairly northerly direction. It passes Mountain View Cemetery and Poplar Spring Cemetery before intersecting SC 181 (Smith–McGee Road). They have a brief concurrency. SC 187 travels to the northwest and crosses over Weems Creek and then Buchanan Creek. It has an intersection with SC 412 (Rainey Road) and one with U.S. Route 29 (US 29). The highway begins curving to the northeast. In West Gate, it intersects SC 24. The two highways travel concurrently to the northwest and cross over part of Lake Hartwell on the Calvin Wesley Belcher Bridge. A short distance later, they split at the Portman Shoals Intersection, with SC 187 traveling to the north. It passes by a KOA Kampground just before an interchange with Interstate 85 (I-85). Just to the west of La France, the highway passes Pendleton High School. Farther to the northeast, it meets its northern terminus, an intersection with US 76/SC 28, just south of Pendleton.

Major intersections

See also

References

External links

SC 187 South Carolina Hwy Index

187
Transportation in Anderson County, South Carolina